Babarap is a village in located in the Gökdepe District of Ahal Province, in southern Turkmenistan. Historically, the name of three villages in Akhal Teke district in the Trans-Caspian region, located not far from the station Geok Tepe of the Trans-Caspian railway. It is located in Akhal Teke oasis, in the foothills of Kopet Dag. Located near the train station, 45 km north-west of Ashgabat, Babarap is a large center of vegetable growing, viticulture and winemaking. The former President of Turkmenistan, Gurbanguly Berdimuhamedow was born in the village.

Geography 
Not far from the village passes through the Trans-Caspian railway and the М37 highway, a large traffic intersection. From the north of the village passes through the Karakum Canal.

References

Populated places in Ahal Region